Killarney District Soccer Club  is an Australian football club based in Bateau Bay, a suburb on the Central Coast of New South Wales, Australia. The club currently competes in the Central Coast Premier League.

History
Killarney District SC was founded in 1972. The club first won silverware in 1999, winning the Association Cup, and in 2003 winning the League Grand Final.

The clubs main success has come in recent years however with 6 straight League Championships from 2016 to 2022 and 4 straight Grand Final Premierships from 2016 to 2019, both Central Coast Premier League records. It also achieved a treble in 2016.

In 2022, Killarney broke history in the Premier League by completing the regular season with 18 wins out of 18, becoming the first club on the Central Coast to achieve this.

The club has also participated in the Australia Cup qualifying rounds 4 times and are somewhat of a giant killer, defeating NSW NPL outfits on several occasions, namely Stanmore Hawks and Mt Druitt Town Rangers in the 2016 competition and Blacktown Spartans in the 2017 competition. Killarney is the only club from Central Coast Football to have made the sixth preliminary round in the cup, just two wins away from the national rounds.

Honours

Senior

League
Central Coast Premier League League Champions 
Winners: 2013, 2016, 2017, 2018, 2019, 2020, 2022
Runners-up: 2003
Central Coast Premier League Grand Final Premiers
Winners: 2003, 2016, 2017, 2018, 2019
Runners-up: 2020, 2022
Central Coast Football Division 1/Premier League 2 League Champions
Winners: 1990, 1993, 2001
Runners-up: 1988, 1989, 2010
Central Coast Football Division 1/Premier League 2 Grand Final Premiers
Winners:  1988, 1989, 2001, 2010
Runners-up: 1990, 1993, 2008

Cup
Central Coast Football Association Cup Champions
Winners: 1999, 2016
Runners-up: 1983

Junior
Jack Atkins Trophy 
Winners: 1978, 1980, 1981, 1997, 2002, 2011, 2020
Bill Pluim Trophy 
Winners: 1991, 1993, 1994, 1995, 1996, 1997, 1998, 1999, 2000, 2001, 2002, 2003, 2004, 2005, 2010, 2013, 2014

Seasons

Notes

References

External links
 

Soccer clubs on the Central Coast, New South Wales
Association football clubs established in 1972
1972 establishments in Australia